The 1982 Japan Series was the 33rd edition of Nippon Professional Baseball's postseason championship series. It matched the Central League champion Chunichi Dragons against the Pacific League champion Seibu Lions. The Lions defeated the Dragons in six games to win their fourth championship in team history, and first championship since 1958. This was also the Lions' first title since moving from Fukuoka to Saitama in 1979.

Summary

See also
1982 World Series

References

Japan Series
Chunichi Dragons
Saitama Seibu Lions
Japan Series
Japan Series
Japan Series